The Marlin Model 25MG is a smooth bore, bolt-action, .22 WMR rifle manufactured by Marlin firearms Company. It was designed to shoot snake shot and marketed as a "Garden Gun" for use in dispatching small garden and farm pests. It also has been used for airport and warehouse pest control.

Based on earlier Marlin .22-caliber designs, the Garden Gun was equipped with a high-visibility front sight but no rear sight. It was available with either a black synthetic stock or a straight-combed hardwood stock.

References 

Marlin Firearms Company firearms
Bolt-action shotguns